The Jewish Agency for Israel formerly known as the Jewish Agency for Palestine, is the largest Jewish non-profit organization in the world. It was established in 1929 as the operative branch of the World Zionist Organization (WZO). The stated mission of the Agency is to "ensure that every Jewish person feels an unbreakable bond to one another and to Israel no matter where they live in the world, so that they can continue to play their critical role in our ongoing Jewish story."

It is best-known as the primary organization fostering the immigration of Jews in diaspora to the Land of Israel (known as aliyah) and overseeing their integration with the State of Israel. Since 1948, the Jewish Agency has brought 3 million immigrants to Israel, and offers them transitional housing in "absorption centers" throughout the country.

The Jewish Agency played a central role in the founding and the development of the State of Israel. David Ben-Gurion served as its Chairman of the Executive Committee from 1935, and in this capacity on 14 May 1948, he proclaimed Israel's independence, following which he served as the first Israeli prime minister. In the years preceding the founding of Israel, the Jewish Agency oversaw the establishment of about 1,000 towns and villages in the British Mandate of Palestine. The organization serves as the main link between Israel and Jewish communities around the world.

By law, the Jewish Agency is a parastatal organization, but does not receive core funding from the Israeli government. The Jewish Agency is funded by the Jewish Federations of North America (JFNA), Keren Hayesod, major Jewish communities and federations, and foundations and donors from Israel and around the world. In 2008, the Jewish Agency won the Israel Prize for its historical contribution to Israel and to the Jewish community worldwide.

History

Name 
Established as the Palestine Office (of the Zionist Organization) in 1908, the organization became the Zionist Commission, later Palestine Zionist Executive, which was designated in 1929 as the "Jewish agency" provided for in the League of Nations' Palestine Mandate and was thus again renamed as The Jewish Agency for Palestine. After the establishment of the State it received its current name, The Jewish Agency for Israel.

1908–1928: Beginnings as an arm of the World Zionist Organization

The Jewish Agency began as the Palestine Office (Hebrew: המשרד הארץ-ישראלי, HaMisrad HaEretz Yisraeli, lit. "Office for the Land of Israel"), founded in Jaffa in 1908, as the operational branch of the Zionist Organization (ZO) in Ottoman-controlled Palestine under the leadership of Arthur Ruppin. The main tasks of the Palestine Office were to represent the Jews of Palestine in dealings with the Turkish sultan and other foreign dignitaries, to aid Jewish immigration, and to buy land for Jews to settle in.

The Palestine Office was established under the inspiration of Theodor Herzl's vision for a solution to "the Jewish question": the issue of anti-Semitism and the place of Jews in the world. In his pamphlet "The Jewish State," Herzl envisioned the Jewish people settled as an independent nation on its own land, taking its place among the other nation-states of the world. The Palestine Office, which eventually became the Jewish Agency, was based upon Herzl's organizational ideas for how to bring a Jewish state into being.

The influx of Jews to Palestine on the Second Aliyah (1904–1914) made the purchase of land particularly urgent. With the aid of the Jewish National Fund (JNF), the Palestine Office bought land for newcomers in two locations: Chavat Kinneret (near the Sea of Galilee), and Kibbutz Ruhama (near Sderot of today). Kibbutz Ruhama was specifically designated for Russian Jews from the Second Aliyah. Over the following decades, the Palestine Office established hundreds more moshavim and kibbutzim throughout Palestine. The Palestine Office continued to purchase land together with JNF (In Hebrew: Keren Kayemet L'Yisrael, KKL).

With the outbreak of World War I, the anticipated disintegration of the Ottoman Empire raised hopes among Zionists for increased Jewish immigration and eventual sovereignty in Palestine. In 1918, Great Britain conquered the region and it fell under British military rule.

Following the promulgation of the pro-Zionist Balfour Declaration, Dr. Chaim Weizmann, president of the British Zionist Federation formed the Zionist Commission in March 1918 to go to Palestine and make recommendations to the British government. The Commission reached Palestine on 14 April 1918 and proceeded to study conditions and to report to the British government, and was active in promoting Zionist objectives in Palestine. Weizmann was instrumental in restructuring the ZO's Palestine office into departments for agriculture, settlement, education, land, finance, immigration, and statistics. The Palestine Office was merged into the Zionist Commission, headed by Chaim Weizmann.

On 25 April 1920, the Principal Allied Powers agreed at the San Remo conference to allocate the Ottoman territories to the victorious powers and assigned Palestine, Transjordan and Iraq as Mandates to Britain, with the Balfour Declaration being incorporated into the Palestine Mandate. The League of Nations formally approved these mandates in 1922. Article 4 of the Mandate provided for "the recognition of an appropriate Jewish agency as a public body for the purpose of advising and co-operating with the Administration of Palestine in such economic, social and other matters as may affect the establishment of the Jewish National Home and the interests of the Jewish population of Palestine." The ZO leaders had contributed to the drafting of the Mandate. In November 1921, the Zionist Commission became the Palestine Zionist Executive and was designated as the Jewish agency for Palestine for the purpose of Article 4 of the Palestine Mandate.

In 1921 Ze'ev Jabotinsky was elected to the Executive but he resigned in 1923, accusing Weizmann of not being vigorous enough with the Mandatory Government. Other issues between the Revisionists and the agency were the distribution of entry permits, Weizmann's support for the Zionist Labour Movement, and the proposal to expand the Agency. The Revisionists broke completely with Agency in 1935, but rejoined ZO in 1947. In 1951 the ZO/JA included all Zionist organizations except Herut.

The Palestine Zionist Executive was charged with facilitating Jewish immigration to Palestine, land purchase, and planning the general policies of the Zionist leadership. It ran schools and hospitals, and formed a defence force, the Haganah. Chaim Weizmann was the leader of both the World Zionist Organization and the Palestine Zionist Executive until 1929. The arrangement enabled the ZO to issue entry permits to new immigrants.

Jewish Agency for Palestine 1929–1948

Non-Zionists representation 
In 1929, the Palestine Zionist Executive was renamed, restructured and officially inaugurated as The Jewish Agency for Palestine by the 16th Zionist Congress, held in Zurich, Switzerland. The new body was larger and included a number of Jewish non-Zionist individuals and organizations, who were interested in Jewish settlement in Palestine. They were philanthropic rather than political, and many opposed talk of a Jewish State. With this broader Jewish representation, the Jewish Agency for Palestine was recognized by the British in 1930, in lieu of the Zionist Organization, as the appropriate Jewish agency under the terms of the Mandate. The 16th Zionist Congress determined that in the event of the future dissolution of the Agency, the World Zionist Organization would replace it as representative of the Jews for the purpose of the Mandate.

There was strong opposition within the ZO when the idea of enlargement of the Board of Governors of the Jewish Agency was first raised in 1924 to include non-Zionist Jews, and the idea was accepted by the Zionist Congress only in 1927.

Even though non-Zionists took part in the Agency, it was still closely tied to the Zionist Organization. The President of the ZO served as the chair of the Executive Council and the Assembly of the Jewish Agency, and half of the members of the Agency's governing bodies were chosen by the ZO, ensuring a unified policy and close cooperation between the two organizations. The change was Chaim Weizmann's initiative and was established on the principle of parity between Zionist and non-Zionist Jews working together in the building of a Jewish national home.

Those participating included Sholem Asch, H.N. Bialik, Leon Blum, Albert Einstein, Immanuel Löw, Lord Melchett and Herbert Samuel. American non-Zionists received 44 of the 112 seats allotted to non-Zionists. The British Board of Deputies joined as a constituent body.

Weizmann was criticized for being too pro-British. When the 1930 White Paper was published recommending restricting Jewish immigration, his position became untenable and he resigned from the ZO and the Jewish Agency. He protested that the British had betrayed their commitment expressed in the Balfour Declaration and that he could no longer work with them. Nahum Sokolow, who had been elected to succeed Weizmann, remained in his position. Arthur Ruppin succeeded Sokolow as Chairman of the Jewish Agency in 1933 and David Ben-Gurion and Moshe Shertok joined the executive. In 1935, Ben-Gurion was elected Chairman of the Agency to succeed Ruppin.

In 1937 The Peel Commission published its report into the disturbances of the year before. For the first time, partition and the setting up of a Jewish State was recommended. The 1937 Zionist Congress rejected the Commission's conclusions, a majority insisting that the Balfour Declaration referred to all of Palestine and Transjordan, but the executive was authorized to continue exploring what the "precise terms" were. This decision revealed differences within the Jewish Agency, with the non-Zionists disagreeing with the decision and some calling for a conference of Jews and Arabs.

In 1947 the last non-Zionist member of the Jewish Agency, Werner Senator, resigned and while the 50 percent participation of non-Zionists in the Agency before had not worked in practice, the Jewish Agency and the World Zionist Organization now became de facto identical.

Organization 

From 1929 to 1948, the Jewish Agency was organized into four departments: the Government Department (performing foreign relations on behalf of the Jewish community of Palestine); the Security Department; the Aliyah Department, and the Education Department. The Jewish Agency Executive included David Ben-Gurion as chairman, and Rabbi Yehuda Leib Maimon and Yitzhak Gruenbaum, among others.
The Jewish Agency was (and is still) housed in a fortress-like building in the Rehavia neighborhood of Jerusalem. The land for the Rehavia neighborhood had been purchased in 1922 by the Palestine Land Development Corporation, and construction of the Jewish Agency headquarters was paid for by the ZO. The three-winged structure with a large open courtyard was designed by Yochanan Rattner. Along with the Jewish Agency it also houses the headquarters of the JNF and Keren Hayesod-United Israel Appeal. On March 11, 1948, a bomb planted in the courtyard of the building by Arab militants killed 13 and wounded many others. The Keren Hayesod wing was completely destroyed. Leib Yaffe, director-general of Keren Hayesod, was among those killed in the bombing.

The building continues to serve as the headquarters of the Jewish Agency as of 2019. Another building "Kiriyat Moria" is located in southern-east Jerusalem, Armon Hanatziv, Ha-Askan 3. The organization also has satellite sites worldwide.

Pre-state immigration and settlement 1934–1948 
Throughout the years 1934–1948, in a phenomenon known as the Ha'apala (ascension), the Jewish Agency facilitated clandestine immigration beyond the British quotas. In 1938 it established HaMosad LeAliyah Bet (lit. Institution for Immigration B), which took charge of the effort. Overall, in these years, The Agency, in partnership with other organizations, helped over 150,000 people in their attempt to enter Palestine, organizing a total of 141 voyages on 116 ships. The potential immigrants were Jews fleeing Nazi atrocities in Europe and, after the war, refugees from DP camps who sought a home in Palestine. Most of the Ma'apilim ships (of the Ha'apala movement) were intercepted by the British, but a few thousand Jews did manage to slip past the authorities. The operation as a whole also helped to unify the long-standing Jewish community in Palestine as well as the newcomer Jewish refugees from Europe.In these years The Agency made use of the "tower and stockade" (Hebrew: חומה ומגדל) method to establish dozens of new Jewish settlements literally overnight, without obtaining permission from the Mandate authorities. These settlements were built on land purchased by the JNF and relied on an Ottoman law stating that any building with a full roof could not be torn down.
In 1933 the Jewish Agency negotiated a Ha'avara (Transfer) Agreement with Nazi Germany under which approximately 50,000 German Jews were allowed to immigrate to Palestine and retain some of their assets as German export goods.

In 1943, the Jewish Agency's Henrietta Szold joined Recha Freier in developing the Youth Aliyah program, which between 1933 and 1948 rescued more 5,000 young Jews from Europe, brought them to Palestine, and educated them in special boarding schools. According to Professor Dvora Hacohen, between 1933 and 2011 the Youth Aliyah movement helped over 300,000 young people make Aliyah.

When World War II broke out, the Jewish Agency established a committee to aid European Jewry by finding them entry permits to Palestine, sending them food, and maintaining contact. The Agency also helped recruit 40,000 members of the Palestinian Jewish community (a full 8 percent of the Jewish population of Palestine) to be trained by the British military and aid in the Allies' struggle against the Nazis; most served in the Middle East and Africa, but some served behind enemy lines in Europe, among them a group of 32 parachutists that included Hannah Szenes. In total, 800 were killed in their efforts.

When World War II ended the Agency continued to aid illegal immigration to Palestine through HaMossad LeAliyah Bet in an effort known as the Bricha. Between 1945 and 1948 the Jewish Agency sent 66 ships of refugees to Palestine. Most were intercepted by British authorities, who placed the illegal immigrants, who had just survived the Holocaust, in detention camps in Palestine and later in Cyprus. Only with the establishment of the State of Israel were the detainees allowed to enter the country.

Resistance and formation of Israel's first government 

Frustrated with Great Britain's continued anti-Zionist stance, the Jewish Agency helped put together an agreement signed by the Hagannah, the Irgun, and the Lehi to form a United Resistance Movement against the British. In 1946 British troops raided Jewish Agency headquarters as part of Operation Agatha, a broad effort to quash Jewish resistance in Palestine. Important figures in The Agency including Moshe Sharett, head of the Agency's political department, and Dov Yosef, member of the Agency's Executive Committee, were arrested and imprisoned in Latrun.

The United Nations recommended the partition of Palestine on 29 November 1947. Meanwhile, the Jewish Agency collaborated with the Jewish National Council to set up a People's Council (Mo'ezet Ha'am) and National Administration (Minhelet Ha'am). After the declaration of independence on 14 May 1948, these two bodies formed the provisional government of the State of Israel.

The Jewish Agency for Israel

Post-State immigration, settlement, and infrastructure 
Following the establishment of the State of Israel in 1948, the Jewish Agency for Israel shifted its focus to facilitating economic development and absorbing immigrants. Organizationally, it changed its structure: The Aliyah Department remained, as well as the Education Department (which promoted Jewish and Zionist education in the diaspora), but the Security and Government Departments were replaced by the Department of Agriculture and Settlement, and by the Israel Department (supporting activities that help vulnerable populations within Israel).

The Agency's budget in 1948 was IL 32 million; its funding came from Keren Hayesod, the JNF, fund-raising drives, and loans.

In 1949, the Jewish Agency brought 239,000 Holocaust survivors, from DP camps in Europe and detention camps in Cyprus, to Israel. In the years following Israel's founding, Jews in many Arab countries suffered from violence and persecution, and fled or were driven from their homes. The Agency helped to airlift 49,000 Yemenite Jews to Israel on Operation Magic Carpet, and over the next few years brought hundreds of thousands of Jewish refugees to Israel from Northern Africa, Turkey, Iraq, and Iran.

Between 1948 and 1952, about 700,000 immigrants arrived in the new state. The Jewish Agency helped these immigrants acclimate to Israel and begin to build new lives. It established schools to teach them Hebrew, beginning with Ulpan Etzion in 1949. (The first student to register for Ulpan Etzion was Ephraim Kishon.) It also provided them with food, housing, and vocational training. For a time the construction of new housing could not keep up with demand, and many of the new immigrants were placed in temporary ma'abarot, or transit camps.

In 1952 the "Zionist Organization-Jewish Agency for Israel Status Law" was passed by the Knesset formalizing the roles of each group. It was agreed that the WZO and the Jewish Agency would continue to supervise Aliyah, absorption, and settlement, while the state would handle all other matters previously dealt with by The Agency including security, education, and employment. Article 4 of the Status Law stipulated that the World Zionist Organization (clarified in Article 3 as "also the Jewish Agency") is an "authorized agency" of the State, establishing its ongoing parastatal rather than purely nongovernmental status.

In the early years of the state the Jewish Agency aided in the establishment of a variety of different institutions that developed the country's economic and cultural infrastructure. These included El Al, the national airline; Binyanei HaUma, the national theater and cultural center; and museums, agricultural, and land development companies.

In the years after 1948, the Agency's Department of Agricultural Settlement established an additional 480 new towns and villages throughout Israel. It provided them with equipment, livestock, irrigation infrastructure, and expert guidance. By the late 1960s these towns produced 70% of Israel's total agricultural output.

The Agency also focused its energies on Jews outside of Israel. The Department for Education and Culture in the Diaspora and the Department of Torah Education and Culture in the Diaspora were created to help replace the loss of centers of Jewish learning destroyed by the Holocaust.

Immigration and absorption, 1967–1990s 
Jewish pride and euphoria following Israel's dramatic victory in the Six Day War of 1967 prompted a new wave of immigration. In order to aid in the absorption of this influx of immigrants, the Israeli government's Ministry for Absorption was created in June 1968, taking over some aspects of absorption from The Agency and the ZO.

In the 1980s, the Jewish Agency began to bring the Ethiopian Jewish Community to Israel. On Operation Moses and Operation Joshua more than 8,000 immigrants were airlifted out of Ethiopia. In 1991 about 14,400 Ethiopian Jews were flown to Israel in the space of 36 hours on Operation Solomon. Since then, a steady trickle of immigrants have been brought to Israel from Ethiopia by the Jewish Agency. The Agency has taken charge of housing them in absorption centers, teaching them Hebrew, helping them find employment and in general easing their integration into Israeli society. In 2013 most of the "olim," or new immigrants, in absorption centers are from Ethiopia.

With the collapse of the Soviet Union in the late 1980s, Russian and Eastern European Jews began to stream to Israel in the tens of thousands. In 1990, about 185,000 immigrants arrived from the FSU; in the following year, nearly 150,000 came; and for the rest of the decade a steady average of 60,000 immigrants from the region made their way to Israel every year. Since the fall of the Berlin Wall in 1989, nearly a million Jews and their family members from the former Soviet Union have made Aliyah, presenting tremendous absorption challenges. The Jewish Agency has helped them to integrate through a variety of programs including Hebrew language instruction, placement in absorption centers, and job training.

Program expansion, 1990s–today 
In 1994, the Jewish Agency, together with the United Jewish Communities and Keren Hayesod-United Israel Appeal, established Partnership 2000. Now known as Partnership2Gether or P2G, the program connects 45 Israeli communities with over 500 Jewish communities around the globe in a "sister city"-style network. Diaspora participants travel to Israel and vice versa, and are hosted by their partner communities; schools are connected through the Global Twinning Network; global Jewish communities support loan funds helping entrepreneurs and small business owners in their partner cities; and young Jewish adults in Israel on long-term programs meet with their Israeli peers for dialogue and workshops.

The Jewish Agency provides Jewish communities outside Israel a continuum of programming to "bring Israel" to local worldwide Jewish communities. They do this in part through "shlichim," or emissaries. Shlichim are Israeli educators or cultural ambassadors, who spend an extended period of time (2 months to 5 years) abroad to "bring Israel" to the community. Shlichim are also posted at college campuses in organizations like Hillel or active in youth organizations.

Other Jewish Agency-sponsored programs that are instrumental in inspiring Jewish youth with a connection to Israel are "Israel Experiences" (educational visits to Israel) such as Taglit-Birthright Israel, a 10-day visit to Israel provided free-of-charge to young Jewish adults. The Jewish Agency is an important organizational partner in the Taglit-Birthright initiative.

In 2004, the Jewish Agency and the Government of Israel together created (and continue to co-sponsor as of 2016) Masa Israel Journey, which provides stipends to young Jews between the ages of 18–30 who would like to study, volunteer, or perform internships in Israel for a period of 5–12 months.

During this period, the Jewish Agency's Israel Department focused (and continues to focus) on strengthening Israel's periphery, namely the Galilee region in the north and the Negev in the South. The emergence of the high-tech industry in Israel created a significant socio-economic disparity between the center of country and the outer regions. Thus, the Jewish Agency sought (and continues to seek) to "lessen cultural and economic gaps."

For example, its Youth Futures program, founded in 2006, includes a holistic approach to dealing with at-risk youth in Israel: each child, referred to the program by a teacher or social worker, is connected to a "Mentor" who is responsible for connecting the child to resources and community services. The Jewish Agency is also a significant partner in the Net@ program offered by Cisco Systems. Program participants are Israeli high school students in socio-economically disadvantaged areas, who study the Cisco computer curriculum and earn certification as computer technicians; they also engage in volunteering and study democratic values.

In July 2022, during the Russian invasion of Ukraine, the Russian Ministry of Justice took steps to stop the Jewish Agency for Israel from operating in Russia, claiming that the Agency had broken Russian law regarding collecting, storing and transferring data.  After the invasion started, there was a sharp increase in emigration from Russia to Israel.

Governance 
The Jewish Agency Executive is charged with administering the operations of the Jewish Agency, subject to the control of the Board of Governors. It has 26 members, of which 24 are chosen by the Board of Governors. The Executive is composed in the following manner: 12 members designated by WZO and 12 members designated jointly by JFNA/UIA and Keren Hayesod. In addition, the World Chairperson of Keren Hayesod and the Chairperson of the JFNA Executive are ex-officio members in the Executive. Doron Almog is the current chair. Yaakov Hagoel was serving as acting chairman since Isaac Herzog vacated the position upon becoming Israel's 11th president.

Over the years the Executive board has included many prominent members of Israeli society. Some of the famous Israelis who have served on the board include: M. D. Eder – 1922; Frederick Kisch – 1922–31; Haim Arlosoroff – 1931–33; Moshe Shertok – 1933–48; Arthur Ruppin – 1933–35; David Ben-Gurion (Chairman of the Executive) – 1935–48.

Past Chairmen of the Executive

Source:
 Frederick Hermann Kisch – 1923–31
 Haim Arlosoroff – 1931–33
 Arthur Ruppin – 1933–35
 David Ben-Gurion – 1935–48
 Berl Locker – 1948–56
 Zalman Shazar – 1956–61
 Moshe Sharett – 1961–65
 Louis Arie Pincus – 1965–74
 Pinhas Sapir – 1974–75
 Yosef Almogi 1976–78
 Arieh Dulzin – 1974 1978–87
 Simha Dinitz – 1987–94
 Avraham Burg – 1995–99
 Sallai Meridor – 1999–2005
Ze'ev Bielski – 2005–09
 Natan Sharansky – 2009–18
 Isaac Herzog – 2018–2021 
Yaakov Hagoel (acting chairman) – 2021 – 2022
Doron Almog 2022–present
The Board of Governors, which meets not less than three times a year, is the central policy-making body of the Jewish Agency. The 120 Governors play a crucial role in the governance of the Agency in overseeing budgets and operations and in recommending policy to the Agency. Members of the Board are elected to serve for a two-year term in the following manner: 60 of the members (50 percent) are designated by WZO; 36 of the members (30 percent) are designated by JFNA/UIA; 24 members (20 percent) are designated by Keren Hayesod. The Board of Governors determines policy of the Jewish Agency for Israel and manages, supervises, controls, and directs its operations and activities. The current chairperson of the Board of Governors, as of July 2014, is Mr. Charles (Chuck) Horowitz Ratner.
The Assembly, which meets at least once every two years, is the supreme governing body of the Jewish Agency. It has 518 delegates who are elected in the following manner: 259 of the members (50 percent) are designated by the WZO; 155 of the members (30 percent) are designated by the Jewish Federations of North America/United Israel Appeal (JFNA/UIA); and 104 of the members (20 percent) are designated by Keren Hayesod. The Assembly is responsible for determining basic policies and goals of the Jewish Agency; receiving and reviewing reports from the Board of Governors; making recommendations on major issues; and adopting resolutions on the above.

The Director General is responsible, under the direction of the Chairperson of the Executive, for the implementation of policies established by the Assembly, the Board of Governors and the Executive. In addition, he/she is responsible for all operations and administration of the Jewish Agency, including implementation of long-term strategic goals. The current Director General is Amira Ahronoviz, the first woman to hold the position.

Funding and budget 
The Jewish Agency is funded by the Jewish Federations of North America, Keren Hayesod, major Jewish communities and federations, and foundations and donors from Israel and around the world.

Due to the volatile U.S. dollar, the global economic crisis and the Madoff scandal, the Jewish Agency for Israel was forced to make significant cuts to its budget. The Board of Governors voted to cut $45 million in November 2008 and an additional $26 million at the February 2009 meeting.

The organization's total operating budget in 2013 was US$355,833,000, and its projected operating budget for 2014 was US$369,206,000. Its operating budget for 2019 is US$379,807,000.

Jewish Agency International Development, the organization's main fundraising arm in North America, is a registered 501(c)(3).

Current programs 

As of 2019, the Jewish Agency sponsors dozens of programs that connect Jews to Israel and to each other. The Agency organizes the programs into four different categories: 1. Connecting young Jews to Israel and their Jewish identity (Jewish and Zionist education in the Jewish diaspora); 2. Connecting young Israelis to the Jewish people and their Jewish identity; 3. Aliyah and absorption; 4. Supporting vulnerable populations in Israel.

Some programs:

Connecting young Jews to Israel and their Jewish identity

Israel experiences 
The Israel Experience programs bring young Jews from around the globe to Israel to get to know the country and deepen their Jewish identities.
 Taglit-Birthright Israel provides ten-day educational trips to Israel, Jerusalem and the Golan Heights for Jews ages 18 to 26 from around the world, completely free of charge. The Jewish Agency is the largest organizational partner in the initiative and is directly involved in bringing thousands of  participants on Taglit-Birthright each year, with a special focus on facilitating Taglit-Birthright experiences for participants from the United States and from the former Soviet Union (FSU).
 Masa Israel Journey is a public-service organization founded in 2004 by the Government of Israel's Office of the Prime Minister, together with the Jewish Agency. It includes programs in Israel for Jews aged 18–30, including study programs, service programs, and career development. Programs last from 2–12 months. In 2018 it provided scholarships to nearly 9,800 participants. Masa also performs outreach and operates alumni activities.
 Israel Tech Challenge is a partnership of the Jewish Agency with the National Cyber Bureau and other partners and donors. It offers trips to Israel of varying lengths for students and young professionals (aged 18–30) with knowledge in the field of computer science and programming. The programs offer visits with Israeli hi-tech professionals and academics, along with experience or training in coding, cyber security and/or data science.
Machon Le Madrichim trains Jewish counselors from Zionist youth movements around the world in Israel, to give them tools for running educational Zionist programs in their home communities when they return. It was founded in 1946 by the World Zionist Organization. As of 2018, it had 17,000 alumni from around the world. Today the Machon trains several hundred young leaders each year.
 Na'ale allows Jewish teenagers from the diaspora to study in Israel and earn a high school diploma. Students start the program in ninth or tenth grade and graduate after the twelfth grade with a full Israeli matriculation certificate (bagrut). During the first year, students follow an intensive Hebrew-language program so that they become able to speak, read and write in Hebrew. The program is fully subsidized by the Israeli government. The Na'ale scholarship includes: fully subsidized tuition, free ticket to Israel, room and board, health insurance, trips, and extra curricular activities. Na'ale offers a variety of schools all over Israel from which candidates may choose, including secular, national religious, ultra-orthodox, kibbutz, and urban boarding schools. The Jewish Agency is involved in recruitment in the former Soviet Union.
 "Students before Parents" ("סטודנטים לפני הורים", abbreviated as  סל"ה, SELA, Selah), a  program for young immigrants  from the countries of the former Soviet Union aimed at the preparation to the education in Israel, bringing young Jews to Israel in hopes that their families follow them.  The program includes learning Hebrew, English, mathematics, and Jewish history and tradition.

Jewish and Zionist education outside Israel 
In its mission to strengthen the ties between Israel and worldwide Jewry and to promote Jewish culture and identity, the Jewish Agency sends out shlichim, or emissaries, to Jewish communities across the globe; partners with Israel and Diaspora communities, and operates and/or funds Jewish educational programs. It also supports Jewish inclusion and diversity programs.

Jewish Agency Israel Fellows  are Israeli young adults who have completed army service and university study. These "Campus Shlichim" travel for two years university campuses with the goal of empowering student leadership and promoting positive engagement with Israel. According to the Jewish Agency, the aims of an Israel Fellow are to "create an ongoing Israel presence for Jewish students and the broader community  . . . . partner with student organizations, campus study abroad offices, Jewish and Israel studies departments, local Jewish federations, Israeli consulates, and Jewish Community Centers ... [and] follow through with Taglit-Birthright trip alumni via one-on-one meetings and special programs and events to keep them active and encourage them to continue their Jewish journeys while in college." In 2017–18, 92 Fellows were sent to campuses in North America, South America, and other regions.
Shlichim (Jewish Agency "emissaries") are active in communal organizations, Jewish schools, community centers, synagogues and youth movements. There are also summer Shlichim who serve in Jewish summer camps. They serve as a central resource for Israel education in the local community. In the 2017–18 program year, the Jewish Agency sent 1,388 short-term emissaries to summer camps and other programs, and around 400 long-term emissaries to countries around the world (not including the Israel Fellows).
Programs for Russian-speaking Jewry: The organization has developed special outreach to Russian Jewry, because they have largely been separated from Jewish communities even after the fall of the Soviet Union. Only an estimated 20 percent of the 800,000 Jews across former Soviet states are engaged in Jewish life. And Russian Jews who have emigrated to other countries have often been separated from Jewish community life. The Agency runs programs for them (in the former Soviet Union, Germany, Austria and Israel) that fall are organized into four areas: (1) Camping, youth education, and counselor training (2) leadership training (3) visits to Israel (4) Focus on facilitation of Aliyah from the former Soviet Union and Germany.
FSU Summer and Winter Camps introduce young Russian-speaking Jews in the former Soviet Union to their Jewish heritage. Staffed by trained local counselors and Russian-speaking Israeli counselors, participants are introduced to Jewish history, Jewish customs and practices, and Israel. The Agency organizes counselors to follow up with attendees in year-round Jewish educational activities. In 2018, some 8,200 participants in the former Soviet Union attended sleepaway camps and 1,487 went to day camps.
Partnership2Gether and the Global School Twinning Network: see below.
The Emergency Assistance Fund provides for physical security improvements, such as video surveillance & CCTV, alarms, locks, gates, and reinforced walls/doors/windows, at synagogues, Jewish community centers, schools, and camps so that Jewish communal life can continue in greater safety. Jewish institutions outside Israel and North America are eligible for assistance. The 2018 allocations totaled around $1.4 million: $781,000 to institutions in Europe, $423,000 to facilities in Latin America, $82,000 to those in the former Soviet Union, and $109,000 to the Middle East. As of the end of 2018, the Fund has allocated over $11.5 million to hundreds of institutions in dozens of countries.
Jewish People Policy Institute  focuses on strategic thinking and global policy planning on six issues critical to the Jewish future: geopolitics; Jewish identity; community bonds; economic assets and influence; demography; and literacy, creativity, and innovation. The institute, established by the Jewish Agency in 2002 as an independent think tank, has engaged the best minds in the areas of strategy and planning in the Jewish world. The staff examines the challenges, threats, and opportunities faced by the Jewish people and develops action-oriented policy recommendations for the government of Israel and major Jewish organizations. JPPI holds annual conferences and meetings that explore the Jewish condition. Participants have included Dennis Ross, Shimon Peres, Natan Sharansky, Malcolm Hoenlein, and Tzipi Livni. The Institute conducts meetings, publishes reports and position papers, and produces contingency plans that help the development of Jewish communities around the world.

Connecting young Israelis to the Jewish people and their Jewish identity 

Partnership 2gether (P2G, previously known as Partnership 2000) is the "peoplehood platform" that connects some 450 Jewish and Israeli communities in 46 partnerships. The program has more than 350,000 participants each year. Its goals are to "connect the global Jewish family, increase Jewish identity, strengthen Israeli society, create living bridges to Israel and understanding of life in the Jewish state, and increase understanding of the rich variety of religious expression and renewal around the world."
The Global School Twinning Network connects schools in Israel to Jewish schools around the world, usually as part of a P2G partnership. Students share projects and communicate via Skype and Facebook. The Network includes 668 schools in 334 pairings, serving about 52,000 children and teens.
Support for Religious Streams: In 2014, the Jewish Agency allocated $2.8 million to 30 educational programs in Israel under the auspices of the Reform, Conservative, and Modern Orthodox movements. Their goal is to "help Israelis understand the varied expressions of Judaism outside Israel, and help Jews worldwide feel that their styles of Jewish expression can find a home in Israel."
Ami-Unity is a comprehensive strategy to encourage Israelis to explore the rich tapestry of Jewish life worldwide and stimulate them assume responsibility for ensuring that Israel is the national home for all Jews. Aimed at Israelis aged 7–25, Ami-Unity increases interest in the global Jewish community, exposes them to the diversity of Jewish life, cultivates feelings of being part of a larger Jewish family, instills tolerance and inclusiveness, and stresses the importance of religious pluralism. Ami-Unity is an umbrella partnership that aims to achieve long-term systemic change. To maximize impact, Ami-Unity builds cross-sector partnerships and trains educators in the partner organizations to develop and implement high-quality content to their own audiences. Those partners include bodies that provide formal education (the Ministry of Education's Division of Jewish-Israeli Culture), informal education (the Council of Youth Movements and the Council of Youth Organizations), pre-army education (the Council of Pre-Army Academies) and post-army education (the Student Union and Hillel Israel). In 2018, a total of 250,000 Israeli children, teens and young adults engaged in the resulting curricula.
Mechinot: Post-High School Service Learning programs provide Israeli 18–19-year-olds with a 6-month opportunity for Jewish study, volunteering, skill-building, and personal development in the period between their graduation from high school and their induction to the IDF. The programs introduce participants to the diversity of Israeli society and the Jewish world, and encourage a mix of self-reliance and communal responsibility; they give the high school graduates a framework in which to develop leadership abilities, and increase their chances of acceptance to a more high-level or elite army unit. This preparation can improve their career trajectory for the long-term. Participants live, work, and study together in small groups with inspiring role models. There are four clusters of such programs: (a) Derech Eretz, Alma, and Harel are pre-army mechinot, or preparatory programs, for young people from Israel's outlying regions with few educational or professional opportunities, or from socio-economically depressed neighborhoods. (b)  Kol Ami brings together Israeli and Diaspora Jews. The Diaspora participants stay for three months, during which the entire group explores issues of the Jewish people and Israel; the Israelis stay on for another three months of army preparation. (c) Aharai! B'Ir, whose curriculum is similar to that of Derech Eretz, but differs in that it is a day program, based in urban settings, and therefore meets the needs of those Israeli high school graduates whose families are so poor that the young people must stay at home to work or care for family members until their army inductions. (d) Post-Army Mechinot helps just-released IDF soldiers transition into civilian life and learn vocational skills.

Aliyah 

The Jewish Agency still brings thousands of Jews to move to Israel each year. In 2014, The Agency helped a total of nearly 26,500 olim (immigrants) make Aliyah, the highest number in 13 years. They noted significant growth in immigration from Ukraine and France. The Agency continues to support these olim as they integrate into Israeli society.

Aliyah of Rescue is the Jewish Agency's Aliyah infrastructure that brings Jews suffering persecution or economic distress to Israel. The services include covert operations to help Jews move out of Middle Eastern and North African countries with which Israel does not have diplomatic relations.
Pre-Aliyah Services are provided by the Jewish Agency to prospective immigrants around the world. Agency shlichim, or emissaries, give guidance on issues such as education, housing, health and employment opportunities in Israel. For those who do not have an emissary nearby, The Agency provides assistance online and on the phone through its Global Service Center. Additionally, The Agency is responsible for verifying that each potential immigrant is eligible for Aliyah under Israel's Law of Return and, once eligibility is proven, for facilitating the receipt of the Aliyah visa via the local Israeli embassy or consulate.
Absorption Centers around the country offer temporary housing for new immigrants and provide space for Hebrew instruction, preparation for life and employment in Israel, events, activities and cultural presentations. 17 of The Agency's 22 Absorption Centers cater specifically to Ethiopian olim and provide services tailored to the needs of the Ethiopian community. The other five house immigrants from around the world, primarily the FSU, South America, and the Middle East.
Ulpan: Intensive Hebrew language programs for new immigrants include five hours of immersive language instruction, five days a week, for five months. The programs are offered free of charge to all new immigrants. Ulpan instructors are certified by the Ministry of Education.
Centers for Young Adults provide ulpan classes, accommodations and a range of services to ease absorption for olim ages 18–35. These centers include the Ulpan Etzion network for college graduates and young professionals; Beit Brodetzky in Tel Aviv and Ulpan Kinneret in Tiberias, for high school graduates looking for job or army preparation; and Kibbutz Ulpan, combining Hebrew instruction with volunteer work on ten different kibbutzim. It also includes Selah, a program for high school graduates from the Former Soviet Union, and TAKA, which combines ulpan studies with pre-academic preparatory courses for immigrants headed to Israeli colleges who wish to polish their skills.
Wings encompasses an array of services including practical guidance and personal mentorship for young immigrants who join the IDF as lone soldiers, far from their families.

Supporting vulnerable populations in Israel 
The Jewish Agency also helps vulnerable populations in Israel and around the world.
 Youth Futures is a community-based initiative for mentoring at-risk pre-teens and adolescents. Each Youth Futures "mentor" works with 16 at-risk children over the course of three years, teaching skills for academic improvement and social integration. In 2014–15, approximately 350 trained Youth Futures staff members worked with 5,000 children and teens, plus 7,000 of their family members, in 200 schools in 35 communities in Israel. In addition to secular and traditional Jews, Youth Futures serves Arab, Bedouin, Druze, and Ultra-Orthodox communities.
 Youth Villages provide safe, cost-effective boarding school settings for 850 young people ages 12 to 18 who have severe emotional, behavioral and family problems. The four Jewish Agency youth villages provide intensive, holistic services and help the youths succeed in and complete high school, and enter the Israeli army with their peers.
 Project TEN brings together young Israelis and their Jewish peers from across the globe to work on sustainable projects in developing regions. Participants spend three months working in onsite service projects in vulnerable communities. Project TEN is a service-learning program designed to build participants' Jewish identities while they serve others. In 2022, Project TEN runs volunteer centers in Winneba, Ghana; Oaxaca, Mexico; Gondar, Ethiopia;  Kibbutz Harduf, Israel; and Mitzpe Ramon. In 2015 the program involved 200 volunteers around the world.
 Young Activism includes programs that train and support young-adult Israeli volunteers, who go on to create their own social entrepreneurship projects, thus widening the circles of influence. The Young Activism programs include (a) support for Young Communities, groups of idealistic young Israelis who commit to settling long-term in Israel's high-need areas and creating programs that increase local quality of life. (b) Choosing Tomorrow, which encourages university students in Israel's outlying areas to create young communities and settle long-term in the region (c) Ketzev, which provides extra training and mentoring to some of the young communities to help them build self-sustaining "social entrepreneurship" businesses, that provide cultural or educational benefits to customers. (d) Click, which provides microgrants to individual volunteers or very small groups, to help them launch small-scale local projects. (e) The Young Adults' Hub in Arad, where dozens of Israelis and Diaspora Jews receive subsidized housing in exchange for their volunteer activities for the city.
 Net@ gives high-performing teenagers an opportunity to rise above their families' socio-economic backgrounds by training them for four years in marketable computer skills, leading to certification as computer and network technicians through Cisco Systems. The program is in addition to the participants' high school course load and also increases their English comprehension skills. In 2014, around 1,100 teens participated in the program, and another 400 children participated in Net@ Junior.
 Loan funds assist entrepreneurs and business owners in Israel to open or expand their businesses, through loans with highly attractive conditions as well as comprehensive business guidance. The Jewish Agency acts as a partial guarantor for the loans, to support those businesses that otherwise would have a difficult time qualifying for loans or presenting the necessary collateral for them. The various funds have different eligibility criteria, with some focusing on stimulating the economy in specific regions of Israel, and others focusing on specific populations of business owners, such as Israeli Arabs, Ethiopian-Israelis, immigrants, etc.
 The Fund for Victims of Terror provides two forms of financial assistance to those who have been wounded, or had family members killed, in a terrorist attack or war against Israel. It provides immediate assistance in the 24–48 hours after the attack, and it provides subsidies for long-term rehabilitation needs. In 2014, the fund provided emergency grants to 120 families impacted by Operation Protective Edge, and more than 1 million shekels (around $250,000 according to the exchange rate at the time) to 80 families with long-term effects from Operation Pillar of Defense. 
 Amigour is a Jewish Agency subsidiary that provides housing for Israel's elderly. In 2014 it operated 57 facilities that housed 7,500 seniors, mainly Holocaust survivors. Additionally, it operates 13,000 public housing apartments that provide government-subsidized housing to 40,000 single-parent families, elderly, and new immigrants.

Services for Israeli Arabs and minorities 
As part of its efforts to strengthen Israeli society and to support vulnerable populations in Israel, the Jewish Agency has, for many years, supported or operated programs that encourage co-existence between Israeli Jews and Israeli Arabs, and programs designed specifically to serve Israel's non-Jewish citizens, and they continue to create new ones. Some of the programs:

 Youth Futures, the mentorship program for middle-school students, is active in 36 locations around Israel. Some localities served by Youth Futures are Jewish, while others are mixed and, in recent years, the Jewish Agency has begun to serve children and families living in completely non-Jewish locales: East Jerusalem (100% Arab participants), Tel Aviv-Yafo (32% of participants are Arab), Acco and Matte Asher (34%), Lod (57% Arab/Bedouin), Horfeish (100% Druze), and El Kassum (100% Bedouin).
 Choosing Tomorrow, one of The Agency's "Young Activism" social entrepreneurship training programs, includes three groups of Arab university and college students (total 40 students) who are being trained to create their own social-welfare programs that will specifically benefit their local (Arab) communities. These groups are in Be'er Sheva, the Jezre'el Valley, and a group at the Alkassemy Arab College. Additionally, Choosing Tomorrow groups in the Negev work to improve medical services to the Bedouin population, by teaching Arabic to local doctors and helping them understand and connect with Bedouin culture.
Neve Midbar is a boarding school that develops leadership among teenage Bedouin boys.
 Net@ is a program supported by the Jewish Agency. In its chapters in Ramle, Nazareth, Acre, Jerusalem, and Tel Aviv-Yafo, Jewish and Arab teenagers study computers together, volunteer in community computer labs together, and serve as mentors together to junior-high school participants. In addition, Net@ has all-Arab chapters in Umm Al Fahm, Yirka, and Tira. 25% of all counselors in Net@ are Israeli Arab.

 Acharai Pre-Army Academy (Mechinah) includes a mixed Jewish-Druze group and a mixed Jewish-Christian group in which soon-to-be-enlisted young Israelis of both religions work together to volunteer, promote co-existence, and prepare for their IDF service.
 Atidim is a national Israeli program provides scholarships and educational activities to gifted students, funded in part by the Jewish Agency. Most programs serve both Jewish and non-Jewish students, and there are some programs dedicated specifically to the Arab sector. All told, in 2014 Atidim programs included more than 2,340 non-Jewish participants, including Druze, Bedouin, Arabs and other non-Jewish Israelis. Additionally the alumni association includes hundreds of Arab, Druze, and Bedouin graduates.
 Jewish Agency scholarship funds benefit Arab recipients as well as Jewish ones.
 Jewish Agency loan funds often help Israeli-Arab small business owners to receive bank loans at favorable rates. The nine different funds act as guarantors. One of the funds specifically aims to assist small business owners who are Arab, ultra-Orthodox, female, Ethiopian, or immigrants.

Emergency projects

Responses to military crises in Israel 
During times of military crisis, the Jewish Agency for Israel provides a comprehensive range of services that, for the sake of efficiency and to avoid duplicating resources, are coordinated fully with the Government of Israel and other major organizations. Among them are:

Respite camping for children in the line of fire: For example, During the 2006 Lebanon War, the Jewish Agency moved 50,000 children from northern Israel to 50 residential camps out of the rocket range. 12,000 children went to Jewish Agency-equipped camp-style day care held in community centers. During the 2014 Israel-Gaza conflict (Operation Protective Edge) the Jewish Agency arranged for children from Israeli areas in the line of fire to enjoy "days of respite" for fun activities in regions less likely to experience air raids. According to the organization's Annual Report for 2014–15, they provided 73,500 such experiences.

Special services for lone soldiers on the front: During the 2014 Israel-Gaza conflict, the Jewish Agency provided mental health intervention and financial support to 340 "lone soldiers," IDF soldiers from overseas who do not have close family members living in Israel.

Trauma therapy and other extra support for residents of absorption centers: During the 2006 Lebanon War,  after a number of absorption centers were hit by rockets, the Jewish Agency moved 2,100 new immigrants to safety and distributed 2,700 bomb shelter kits. During the 2014 Israel-Gaza conflict, they provided 2,000 hours of therapy for new immigrants.

Special loan funds for small businesses in affected areas, to prevent them from going out of business and to boost the local economy during times of distress. For example, during the 2006 Lebanon War, the Jewish Agency established a micro-business loan fund in the north.

Fund for the Victims of Terror: During the 2014 Israel-Gaza conflict, for example, the Jewish Agency gave 120 grants from the Fund for the Victims of Terror to Israeli families who had suffered death or major physical injury.

Scholarships for university students in affected areas: In the aftermath of the 2014 Israel-Gaza conflict, for example, the Jewish Agency distributed 1,300 scholarships in March 2015 to students who live , or study , from the Gaza border.

Sderot 

The Jewish Agency has played an important role in supporting the residents of Sderot and the surrounding area, which has been the target of many rockets launched from Gaza. More than 12,000 children have enjoyed respite activities in the center and north of the country (during Operation Protective Edge); 300 educators have been trained to work with children living through trauma (during Operation Cast Lead); supplemental educational activities have been offered to more than 2,000 students; the S.O.S. Emergency Fund for Victims of Terror helped more than 200 people whose lives were directly affected by the Kassam attacks; 100 bomb shelters were renovated in the region during Cast Lead and 500 during Operation Protective Edge; and 500 students received scholarships (during Cast Lead) to study at Sapir College in Sderot, with more scheduled to receive scholarships as of the aftermath of Operation Protective Edge.

Israel Fires Emergency Fund 
In November 2016, Israel experienced eight days of devastating fires. At least 75,000 people were evacuated from their residences, as 1,773 blazes razed over 600 homes and damaged hundreds more. The Government of Israel determined that while most were caused by weather conditions and negligence, many had been acts of terror.

Within days, the Jewish Agency created the Israel Fires Emergency Fund, modeled on the Fund for Victims of Terror. Generous contributions from partners, the Jewish Federations of North America—led by the Jewish United Fund/Jewish Federation of Metropolitan Chicago and CJP-Greater Boston's Jewish Federation—as well as Keren Hayesod and other donors, allowed the Jewish Agency to issue grants of $1,000 per household to victims right away. These funds provided immediate support as families faced urgent needs of food, shelter and clothing. By the end of December 2016, the Jewish Agency had delivered 618 grants across the country, with 29 additional grants in the first months of 2017.

Strategic plans

2010 
At the February 2010 Board of Governors meeting, Natan Sharansky announced a shift in the priorities of the Jewish Agency from Aliyah to strengthening Jewish identity for young adults around the world.

From 1948 until 2009, the Jewish Agency was organized into departments: the Aliyah and Absorption department, which was responsible for the immigration and integration of Jews coming to Israel; the Education department, which worked to deepen the connection of Jews worldwide to Israel; and the Israel department, which focused on improving the lives of socio-economically vulnerable Israelis. (A fourth department, for Agriculture and Settlement, had been in operation starting in 1948, but had closed long before 2009.)

In order to increase efficiency, the Jewish Agency, under the leadership of its new Chairman of the Executive, Natan Sharansky, decided to restructure the organization. The three main departments were reorganized into the following six program units:
 Israel Experiences  – provides opportunities for young Jews from around the world to encounter Israel and meet Israelis, and for Israelis to meet them
 Shlichim and Israel Fellows – sends Israeli emissaries to Diaspora communities worldwide to strengthen Jewish identity and connection to Israel
 Russian-Speaking Jewry – runs programs for Russian-speaking Jews of all ages around the world, with a focus on Jewish education and building Jewish communal leadership
 Social Activism – aids the vulnerable in Israel and around the world, and trains young Jews and Israelis to engage in social activism
 Partnerships – oversees Partnership2Gether, connecting Jewish communities in Israel and the Diaspora to learn from each other and to build a sense of global Jewish peoplehood
 Aliyah, Absorption, and Special Operations – aids all immigrants with the Aliyah (resettlement in Israel) process and integration both before and after their arrival, and rescues Jews from areas of distress to bring them to Israel

Each program unit reports directly to the Jewish Agency's Director General. Additionally, The Agency's support units – such as human resources, marketing, and finance – which had until 2009 existed independently for each department, were trimmed and consolidated into single units that serve the entire organization.

Along with the organizational restructuring came a new focus. As the first decade of the 21st century came to a close, The Agency noted that most of global Jewry was now located in democratic, stable societies that were relatively friendly to Jewish residents. As "Aliyah of Rescue" became urgent for decreasing numbers of Jews, new challenges were arising for world Jewry, most notably, Agency leaders remarked, the need to engage young Jews in Jewish culture and to help Israeli Jews and those who live outside Israel to understand each other and feel connected to what they call the "global Jewish family." While continuing "Aliyah of Rescue" operations, The Agency decided to focus its primary energies on fostering a strong relationship between world Jewry and Israel, and on encouraging Aliyah based on a love for the country, what it calls "Aliyah of Choice." Its main vehicle for doing so would be to bring Jews from around the world to Israel on short- and long-term tourist programs to allow them to get to know the country and to give Israelis the opportunity to get to know them and vice versa. Parallel to these efforts, The Agency decided to increase its investment in strengthening Jewish communities around the globe. Its goals would be to grow local Jewish leadership, to strengthen Jewish identity, and to deepen the connection of communities worldwide to Israel and to the Jewish people as a whole.

2019 
At the October 2019 Board of Governors meeting, which marked the 90th anniversary of the organization, the Board passed a decision to somewhat shift the Jewish Agency's areas of focus, in response to new critical challenges that had arisen for the Jewish people. Its "renewed mission" moving into its tenth decade focuses on three areas:

 Continuing to promote Aliyah and ensure Jewish safety: continuing to facilitate both Aliyah of Rescue and Aliyah of Choice; working with other organizations and communities in a common struggle against anti-Semitism and delegitimization of Israel.
 Connecting Jews worldwide to one another and to Israel: bridging the diversity of identities, interests and religious streams in the Jewish world; developing global Jewish leadership
 Advocacy and impact on behalf of world Jewry in Israel: bringing the diversity of voices in the Jewish world to Israeli policy makers and Israeli society at large; helping the Israeli public understand the diversity of Jewish life while building a personal commitment to the Jewish People as a whole; developing a new paradigm for the involvement of world Jewry in Israeli society.

Awards and recognition 
On May 8, 2008, at the Israeli government's 60th Independence Day celebration, the Jewish Agency for Israel was awarded the Israel Prize for lifetime achievement & special contribution to society and the State of Israel.

See also 
 List of Israel Prize recipients
 Nefesh B'Nefesh

References

External links

 Official Jewish Agency Website
 The Jewish Agency for Israel
 The Jewish Agency for Israel (@JewishAgency) | Twitter
 הסוכנות היהודית לארץ ישראל
 Taglit-Birthright Official Website
 Onward Israel Official Website
 MyIsraelSummer  Official Website (Jewish Agency portal)
 Project Ten Official Website (Program is a Jewish Agency initiative)
 Partnership2Gether  Official Website
 Connect Israel (Jewish Agency program)
 Makom (creates Jewish Agency educational content)
 Jewish People Policy Planning Institute Official Website
 The Central Zionist Archives in Jerusalem. Collections of the Jewish Agency for Israel.
 Masa Israel Journey Official Website
 Israel Tech Challenge  Official Website
 Net@ (a program of the Jewish Agency, Cisco, and Appleseeds Academy)
 Amigour (Jewish Agency subsidiary)
 Aliyah Assistance
 Naale Elite Academy – High Schools in Israel

 
Aliyah
History of Zionism
Israel Prize for lifetime achievement & special contribution to society recipients
Israel Prize recipients that are organizations
Jewish organizations based in Israel
Jewish outreach
Jewish refugee aid organizations
Non-profit organizations based in Israel
Organizations based in Jerusalem
Jewish organizations in Mandatory Palestine
Political history of Israel
Politics of Mandatory Palestine
Refugees in Israel
Zionist organizations
Zionism in Mandatory Palestine
1929 establishments in Mandatory Palestine
Mandatory Palestine in World War II
Yishuv during World War II